Brent Sancho CM (born 13 March 1977) is a Trinidadian former professional football player and politician. In February 2015, he became the Minister of Sports for his home country, Trinidad and Tobago.

Club career

College
Born in Port of Spain, Sancho spent his college years playing for St. John's University in New York City, where he was part of the school's only National Championship, in 1996.

Scotland and England
Sancho then spent most of his early career playing in the United States, before joining Dundee in the 2003–04 season. A successful spell in the SPL was followed by a transfer to League One side Gillingham.

In December 2007 Sancho joined Millwall on a month's contract. This was not renewed and he found himself once again without a club until signing for Scottish Football League Division Two champions Ross County, in March 2008 until the end of the 2007–08 season. Sancho went on trial with Wrexham in July 2008 but was not signed by the club.

United States
On 30 June 2008, the TTFF reported that Sancho had been training with TT Pro League team San Juan Jabloteh and Wrexham in an effort to regain a place with the national team as well as further his professional career. Eventually, Sancho returned to the USA in August 2008, joining the Atlanta Silverbacks and playing in eight matches in the remaining part of the season.

On 26 February 2009, the Rochester Rhinos announced the signing of Sancho to a two-year contract.

International career
Sancho played in all three matches in which Trinidad and Tobago took part in the 2006 FIFA World Cup, thus becoming the first former St. John's player and first current Gillingham player ever to play in a World Cup. In the third match, against Paraguay, he scored an own goal and defeat in this game confirmed Trinidad and Tobago's elimination from the tournament.

On 9 October 2006, Sancho announced his retirement from international football along with 12 others. Speaking at a press conference, Sancho said: "It's not just monetary. They have made certain contractual arrangements which they have now reneged on." This followed a dispute between the World Cup players and the Trinidad and Tobago Football Federation regarding bonuses for playing in the World Cup. The issue went to court in the United Kingdom which ruled in favour of the players. Several of the players subsequently returned to the national team, but Sancho did not play for T&T after the 2006 World Cup. As of February 2015, the legal dispute between the players and the national association was still ongoing.

Post-playing activities
In 2010, Sancho was the owner/coach of the Trinidad and Tobago Professional Football League club North East Stars, before setting up his own team called Central FC.

In 2015, Sancho was appointed Minister of Sport in Trinidad and Tobago.

As of 2021, Sancho was assistant manager of the Anguilla national team.

Awards
As a member of the Trinidad and Tobago squad that competed at the 2006 FIFA World Cup in Germany, Sancho was awarded the Chaconia Medal (Gold Class), the second highest state decoration of Trinidad and Tobago.

References

External links
Rochester Rhinos bio

Trinidad and Tobago footballers
Trinidad and Tobago expatriate footballers
Trinidad and Tobago international footballers
Atlanta Silverbacks players
Charleston Battery players
Dundee F.C. players
Expatriate footballers in England
Expatriate footballers in Finland
Expatriate footballers in Scotland
Expatriate soccer players in the United States
Gillingham F.C. players
Joe Public F.C. players
Millwall F.C. players
Myllykosken Pallo −47 players
Portland Timbers (2001–2010) players
Rochester New York FC players
Ross County F.C. players
San Juan Jabloteh F.C. players
Scottish Football League players
Scottish Premier League players
St. John's University (New York City) alumni
St. John's Red Storm men's soccer players
English Football League players
TT Pro League players
A-League (1995–2004) players
USL First Division players
Veikkausliiga players
1977 births
2002 CONCACAF Gold Cup players
2005 CONCACAF Gold Cup players
2006 FIFA World Cup players
Recipients of the Chaconia Medal
Living people
Brooklyn Italians players
Trinidad and Tobago expatriate sportspeople in England
Trinidad and Tobago expatriate sportspeople in Finland
Trinidad and Tobago expatriate sportspeople in Scotland
Trinidad and Tobago expatriate sportspeople in the United States
Government ministers of Trinidad and Tobago
Trinidad and Tobago sportsperson-politicians
Association football defenders
Trinidad and Tobago people of American descent
NCAA Division I Men's Soccer Tournament Most Outstanding Player winners